This list of bridges in Belgium lists bridges of particular historical, scenic, architectural or engineering interest in Belgium. Road and railway bridges, viaducts, aqueducts and footbridges are included.

Historical and architectural interest bridges

Major road and railway bridges

Notes and references 
 

 Others references

See also 

 :fr:Liste des ponts de Bruxelles  - List of bridges in Brussels
 :fr:Liste des ponts de Liège  - List of bridges in Liège
 :fr:Liste des ponts de Namur  - List of bridges in Namur
 :nl:Lijst van bruggen over het Albertkanaal  - List of bridges over the Albert Canal
 Transport in Belgium
 Rail transport in Belgium
 List of motorways in Belgium
 Geography of Belgium

External links

Further reading 
 
 

Belgium
 
Bridges
Bridges